Churandy Thomas Martina (born 3 July 1984) is a Dutch sprinter from Curaçao, currently representing the Netherlands. Previously, he represented the Netherlands Antilles until its dissolution in 2010. His personal best time over 100 metres is 9.91 seconds, a Dutch record, achieved in a 2012 London Olympic Games semi-final. In addition, he holds the 200 metres national record with a time of 19.81 seconds, achieved at the IAAF Diamond League meeting in Lausanne, Switzerland. He originally finished second in the 200 m at the 2008 Olympics in Beijing but was disqualified due to a lane violation.

Career
Born in Willemstad, Curaçao, Martina began his international career at the youth level, reaching the 100 metres semifinals of the 1999 World Youth Championships in Athletics. Moving up to the junior level, he ran at the World Junior Championships in Athletics in 2000 and 2002, although he was less successful at that level. His first gold came in the 100 m at the 2002 South American Games in Belém, Brazil. He improved his personal best to 10.29 seconds in 2003, and represented the Netherlands Antilles at the 2003 CAC Championships (setting a personal best in the heats), and also competed at the 2003 Pan American Games (reaching the semis). He made his first appearance on the world stage at the 2003 World Championships in Athletics, although he was eliminated in the heats of the 100 metres.

He made his first Olympic appearance as one of three competitors representing the Netherlands Antilles at the 2004 Summer Olympics. He bore their flag in the opening ceremony. The 2004 season also saw much improvement in his times as he knocked 0.16 off his previous year's personal record with a 10.13-second run in Santo Domingo. Martina won the 100 m bronze medal at the 2005 Central American and Caribbean Championships and also anchored the Netherlands Antilles team to a national record time in the 4×100 metres relay to win a silver medal. He led the team to the final at the 2005 World Championships in Athletics and improved the national record further to 38.45 seconds for sixth place. He competed in the individual 100 m but was knocked out in the second round.

The following year he ran a Games record to win the 100 m gold medal at the 2006 Central American and Caribbean Games (CAC Games). He also led the relay team to victory for his second gold medal of the tournament. He improved his personal best to 10.04 seconds that year with a run in El Paso, Texas. He had success at continental level in July 2007 when he won the gold medal at the 2007 Pan American Games in the 100 metres, having already run a Games record-equalling time in the qualifiers. He finished fifth in the finals of both the 100 m and 200 m at the 2007 World Championships in Osaka, Japan. He ended the year with a sixth-place finish in the 100 m at the 2007 IAAF World Athletics Final.

2008 Summer Olympics
He bore the national flag for the second consecutive time at the 2008 Summer Olympics in Beijing. In the second round of heats he set a new national record in the 100 m, running below ten seconds for the first time in his career with a time of 9.99 s. In the semi finals he finished third in his race behind Asafa Powell and Richard Thompson, but improved the national record to 9.94 s. He qualified for the final in which he came close to the medals, finishing in fourth place behind Usain Bolt, Thompson and Walter Dix. Whilst he left the final without a medal, he had cause for celebration as he broke the national record for a third time, finishing in 9.93 s.

On 20 August 2008, he originally placed second in the 200 m at the Olympics, finishing behind Usain Bolt with a time of 19.82 s. This would have been both a national record and the second-ever Olympic medal for the Netherlands Antilles after Jan Boersma's silver in the 1988 Summer Olympics in Seoul. However he was disqualified an hour after the race for a lane violation. American Wallace Spearmon, who had initially placed third, was disqualified moments after the race for having stepped on his inside lane line during the race. The American coaches appealed the decision and upon viewing footage of Spearmon's offence they noticed that Martina had committed the same infraction. They dropped their appeal for Spearmon in favour of a successful protest against Martina. As a result of the disqualifications, Shawn Crawford and Walter Dix, both of the United States, were promoted to silver and bronze respectively.

However, on 24 August, the Netherlands Antilles filed an appeal to the Court of Arbitration for Sport to reinstate Martina's medal, arguing that the American protest came after the 30-minute deadline for protests and appeals set by the International Association of Athletics Federations (IAAF), and also that they had their own video footage (not the official Olympic video footage) showing that Martina never left his lane. On 6 March 2009, the CAS rejected the appeal against Martina's disqualification. Shawn Crawford, who had been awarded the Olympic silver medal, reportedly gave his medal to Martina on 28 August 2008.

At the start of the 2009 outdoor season, Martina set a world-leading time of 9.97 seconds in the 100 m at the Fanny Blankers-Koen Games; the fourth time he had finished with a sub-ten-second time. He could not build upon his Olympic success at the 2009 World Championships in Athletics and only reached the quarter-finals of the men's 100 m. He was sixth at the 2010 IAAF World Athletics Final—the competition's final edition. He defended his regional title at the 2010 Central American and Caribbean Games, holding off a challenge from Daniel Bailey to win in 10.07 seconds—just one hundredth off his championship record.

After the dissolution of the Netherlands Antilles, Martina has represented the Netherlands in 2011 World Championships and 2012 European Championships, where he won gold in 200 metres and 4x100 metre relay.

2012 Summer Olympics

Martina competed at the London 2012 Summer Olympics, again in his three disciplines, the 100 metres, 200 metres and 4x100 metre relay. Only narrowly making it through to the 100-metre semi-final, Martina improved his personal best in the semi-final to 9.91. This race was also the fastest ever semi-final run, with Justin Gatlin running 9.82. In the final, Martina placed sixth behind Usain Bolt, posting 9.94. Martina then competed in the 200 m, where he finished in fifth, again behind Bolt, in 20 seconds flat. In the relay, the Netherlands finished sixth in a time of 38.39. However, after the Olympics, Martina broke the 200 m national record in Lausanne, lowering the time to 19.85, ending his reasonably successful season.

In 2016, Martina won the European Championships 100 metres before a home crowd.  The following day, he crossed the line in first place in the 200 metres, but was denied the sprint double because he crossed inside of his lane line again, giving the win to Bruno Hortelano.

International competitions

1Did not finish in the final
2Disqualified in the final

Personal bests

All information from IAAF Profile
Note: Martina's fastest 100 metres time is 9.76 seconds with 6.1 m/s wind. However, the wind assisted run, set in El Paso, Texas on 13 May 2006, exceeds the IAAF's legal limit of 2.0 m/s and cannot qualify as a record.

References

External links

 Churandy Martina profile
 www.churandy.com
 

1984 births
Living people
People from Willemstad
Curaçao male sprinters
Dutch male sprinters
Dutch Antillean male sprinters
Dutch people of Curaçao descent
Olympic athletes of the Netherlands Antilles
Olympic athletes of the Netherlands
Athletes (track and field) at the 2004 Summer Olympics
Athletes (track and field) at the 2008 Summer Olympics
Athletes (track and field) at the 2012 Summer Olympics
Athletes (track and field) at the 2016 Summer Olympics
Pan American Games gold medalists for the Netherlands Antilles
Athletes (track and field) at the 2003 Pan American Games
Athletes (track and field) at the 2007 Pan American Games
Pan American Games medalists in athletics (track and field)
World Athletics Championships athletes for the Netherlands Antilles
European Athletics Championships medalists
World Athletics Championships athletes for the Netherlands
Central American and Caribbean Games gold medalists for the Netherlands Antilles
Central American and Caribbean Games bronze medalists for the Netherlands Antilles
Competitors at the 2006 Central American and Caribbean Games
Competitors at the 2010 Central American and Caribbean Games
IAAF Continental Cup winners
Dutch Athletics Championships winners
Central American and Caribbean Games medalists in athletics
Medalists at the 2007 Pan American Games
Athletes (track and field) at the 2020 Summer Olympics